Melene Rossouw is a South African lawyer and women's rights activist. She is internationally recognised gender and human rights activist, global award winner, public speaker, moderator, facilitator, strategist, and consultant. She is an attorney by profession with more than 13 years experience in the private, governmental, and non-governmental sectors.

Melene graduated from the University of the Western Cape with a Bachelor of Laws (LL. B) and Master of Laws (LL.M) specialising in Public and Constitutional Law, majoring in Human Rights and Law of Intergovernmental Relations. Some of the positions she has held were attorney, legal researcher, national cabinet committee secretary, special advisor to the minister and ministerial media spokesperson.

Melene has served in respected offices such as the Constitutional Court of South Africa, Western Cape High Court, The Presidency of South Africa and two National Government Ministries. In 2017, Melene co-founded Women Lead Movement and currently serves as the Executive Director of the organisation. In 2020, Women Lead Movement established another office in Madagascar to build on its Pan-African vision for the movement.

Some of her accolades include being selected by the prestigious Obama Foundation as an Obama Leader in Africa (2018). She is also a contributor for the Future Africa Forum on Governance and Human Rights in Africa since 2018. In 2019, Melene was selected as one of 11 Spokeswomen in Africa for the Global Campaign on Gender Equality by the US based ONE Global Campaign and has subsequently participated in three more global campaigns such as #YoursInPower and #PassTheMic that respectively reached more than 750 000 and 250 million people globally. In 2019, she was also selected as a Mandela Washington Fellow (MWF) by the US Department of State. Melene is a member of the African Women Leadership Network, which is a movement supported by UN Women and the African Union as well as the Public Speaking Association of Southern Africa. In 2020, Melene was selected by Junior Chamber International (JCI) as one of the Top Ten Outstanding Young Persons of the World honourees in the category for World Peace/Human Rights. She was also selected by JCI South Africa as a Top Ten Outstanding Young Person in South Africa and nominated by Avance Media as ‘100 Most Influential Women in Africa 2020’. In October 2020, Melene was also selected as “100 Most Influential Young Africans” and made the Top Ten list of Most Influential Young Africans in the category for “Leadership and Civil Society” by Africa Youth Awards. In 2021, Melene was appointed as a Play Your Part Ambassador by Official Brand South Africa responsible for promoting a positive and compelling brand image for South Africa.

She was also recently named as one of the 100 Most Influential South Africans and appointed as the youngest Board member of Western Province Professional Rugby. In 2021, Melene was selected as the winner in the category of Public and Private Service for the Accenture Rising Start Awards –most talented young professionals under the age of 40.

Through her work she has initiated and led multiple educational and advocacy programmes and interventions online and in communities reaching thousands of people in South Africa and globally. Melene has also led highly complex public engagement processes on pertinent issues affecting the country and communities. She is often called upon to participate in engagements and share her expertise with government, private sector and NGOs on issues relating to Democracy, Governance and Gender Equality on national, regional, and international platforms. Her vision is to promote a gender equal society and an active and participatory citizenry to strengthen Democracy and Democratic governance.

Early life
Rossouw is from Bellville South. She lived in a dwelling in her aunt's backyard for the first nine years of her life before her mother Deserie earned enough to get them an apartment. Rossouw was athletic growing up, participating in competitions in Pretoria. She graduated with a Bachelor of Laws and a Master of Laws with a specialty in Public and Constitutional Law, both from the University of the Western Cape.

References 

Living people
21st-century South African lawyers
21st-century women lawyers
Cape Coloureds
People from Bellville, South Africa
South African women lawyers
University of the Western Cape alumni
Year of birth missing (living people)